State Trunk Highway 43 (often called Highway 43, STH-43 or WIS 43) was a number assigned to two different state highways in the U.S. state of Wisconsin:
Highway 43 from 1917 to 1923, assigned the Highway 27 designation in 1923
Highway 43 from 1923 to 1974, currently routed as Highway 142 from Burlington to Kenosha

43